Brihaspati VidyaSadan was established with 59 students. The first principal was Mr. Morris Benerjee followed by Mr. Ananda Gurung. Initially, the school was located at Dhobi Khola. In 1986 the school moved from Dhobi Khola to Naxal, in front of Police Headquarters. The first batch of students took the School Leaving Certificate Examination (SLC) in 1990. In 1991, French was introduced as the third language besides English and Nepali. In 2007-08 10+2 level in science stream was added to the existing management stream. In 2008-09 the school also started The University of Cambridge(CIE) A Levels Program along with existing SLC and 10+2 level programs.

History 
Brihaspati Vidyasadan was established in 1985 by Purushottam Raj Joshi. The first principal of the school was Mr. Maurice Banerjee. The school runs the classes up to grade five and initially continues upgrading other classes yearly. The first batch of students took the School Leaving Certificate Examination (SLC) in 1990. Later, 10+2 level was added and started classes in science and management streams. In 2008-09 the school also started The University of Cambridge A Levels program along with existing SLC and 10+2 level programs.

In early years Brihaspati Vidyasadan used to teach its own published books. For the first time computer subjects were introduced by Brihaspati Vidyasadan in school level education. Part of co-curricular STEAM education has been introduced with a fully equipped lab for the first time in Nepal. Brihaspati Vidyasadan also known as the first school to provide in school meals (lunch and tiffin) from the time of establishment.

Academics

 Junior school (Grade one to Three)
 Primary School (Grade Four and Five)
 Middle School (Grade Six to Eight)
 Secondary School (Grade Nine and Ten)
 High School or Plus Two (Grade Eleven and Twelve)

References
Schools in Kathmandu
Educational institutions established in 1985
1985 establishments in Nepal